Rouché's theorem, named after Eugène Rouché, states that for any two  complex-valued functions  and  holomorphic inside some region  with closed contour , if  on , then  and  have the same number of zeros inside , where each zero is counted as many times as its multiplicity. This theorem assumes that the contour  is simple, that is, without self-intersections. Rouché's theorem is an easy consequence of a stronger symmetric Rouché's theorem described below.

Usage 
The theorem is usually used to simplify the problem of locating zeros, as follows. Given an analytic function, we write it as the sum of two parts, one of which is simpler and grows faster than (thus dominates) the other part. We can then locate the zeros by looking at only the dominating part.

Geometric explanation 

It is possible to provide an informal explanation of Rouché's theorem.

Let C be a closed, simple curve (i.e., not self-intersecting).  Let h(z) = f(z) + g(z).  If f and g are both holomorphic on the interior of C, then h must also be holomorphic on the interior of C. Then, with the conditions imposed above, the Rouche's theorem in its original (and not symmetric) form says that

Notice that the condition |f(z)| > |h(z) − f(z)| means that for any z, the distance from f(z) to the origin is larger than the length of h(z) − f(z), which in the following picture means that for each point on the blue curve, the segment joining it to the origin is larger than the green segment associated with it. Informally we can say that the blue curve f(z) is always closer to the red curve h(z) than it is to the origin.

The previous paragraph shows that h(z) must wind around the origin exactly as many times as f(z).  The index of both curves around zero is therefore the same, so by the argument principle,  and  must have the same number of zeros inside .

One popular, informal way to summarize this argument is as follows: If a person were to walk a dog on a leash around and around a tree, such that the distance between the person and the tree is always greater than the length of the leash, then the person and the dog go around the tree the same number of times.

Applications 

Consider the polynomial  (where ). Rouché's theorem can be used to obtain more precise positions of them. Since

Rouché's theorem says that the polynomial has exactly one zero inside the disk . This sort of argument can be useful in locating residues when one applies Cauchy's residue theorem.

Rouché's theorem can also be used to give a short proof of the fundamental theorem of algebra.  Let

and choose  so large that:

Since  has  zeros inside the disk  (because ), it follows from Rouché's theorem that  also has the same number of zeros inside the disk.

One advantage of this proof over the others is that it shows not only that a polynomial must have a zero but the number of its zeros is equal to its degree (counting, as usual, multiplicity).

Another use of Rouché's theorem is to prove the open mapping theorem for analytic functions. We refer to the article for the proof.

Symmetric version 
A stronger version of Rouché's theorem was published by Theodor Estermann in 1962. It states: let  be a bounded region with continuous boundary .

holds on the boundary 

The original version of Rouché's theorem then follows from this symmetric version applied to the functions  together with the trivial inequality  (in fact this inequality is strict since  for some  would imply ).

The statement can be understood intuitively as follows.

Proof of the symmetric form of Rouché's theorem 
Let  be a simple closed curve whose image is the boundary .

i.e., the winding number of the closed curve  around the origin; similarly for g. The hypothesis ensures that g(z) is not a negative real multiple of f(z) for any z = C(x), thus 0 does not lie on the line segment joining f(C(x)) to g(C(x)), and

is a homotopy between the curves  and  avoiding the origin. The winding number is homotopy-invariant: the function

is continuous and integer-valued, hence constant. This shows

See also 
 Fundamental theorem of algebra, for its shortest demonstration yet, while using Rouché's theorem
 Hurwitz's theorem (complex analysis)
 Rational root theorem
 Properties of polynomial roots
 Riemann mapping theorem
 Sturm's theorem

References 

 
 
 Rouché É., Mémoire sur la série de Lagrange, Journal de l'École Polytechnique, tome 22, 1862, p. 193-224. Theorem appears at p. 217. See Gallica archives.

Articles containing proofs
Theorems in complex analysis